Sekhemre Shedwast (also Sekhemreshedwaset) was a native ancient Egyptian pharaoh of the 16th Theban Dynasty during the Second Intermediate Period.

His throne name Sekhemre Shedwast, translates literally as "the Might of Re which rescues Thebes", while his personal name is unknown. Sekhemre Shedwast is unattested outside the Turin King List, where he appears as the successor of king Bebiankh.

It has been suggested, but not universally accepted, that Sekhemre Shedwast may be identical to Sekhemre Shedtawy Sobekemsaf II, since their throne names are similar. If so, he may have been married to queen Nubkhaes II and they may have had a son named Sekhemre-Wepmaat Intef.

References

16th-century BC Pharaohs
Pharaohs of the Sixteenth Dynasty of Egypt